George Darko (born 12 January 1951 in Akropong, Ghana) is a Ghanaian burger-highlife musician, guitarist, vocalist, composer and songwriter, who has been on the music scene since the late 1960s. Darko was popular in the 1970s, 1980s and 1990s, and his songs are some of the most timeless and enduring highlife tracks in Ghana's music circles. Some of his contemporaries include Ben Brako, C.K. Mann, Daddy Lumba, Ernest Nana Acheampong, Nana Kwame Ampadu, Pat Thomas, among others. He is widely considered to be one of the pioneers of burger-highlife with his first hit "Ako Te Brofo" ("The Parrots Speak/Understands English") which was released in 1983. The song remains  popular among Ghanaians both at home and abroad, and is still played at funerals and parties.

Son of a paramount chief, George Darko was educated at the Presbyterian School at Akropong. After playing for an army band entertaining troops in the Middle East, Darko returned to Ghana and formed the Golden Stool Band. In the late 1970s the band moved to Germany, where Darko went solo and formed the Bus Stop band in 1982. Returning to Akropong in 1988, he was made Tufuhene of Akropong-Akuapim in 1991 with the stool (throne) name of Nana Yaw Ampem Darko. In January 2010, he demanded and received apologies from a newspaper which had reported sex allegations in connection with him.

Discography
Studio albums
 Friends (1983, Taretone)
 Highlife Time (1983, Sacodisc International)
 Moni Palava (1986, A&B Records)
 Soronko (1988, Musicolor)
 Highlife in the Air (1994, Boulevard Records)
 Come to Africa (2006, Okoman Records)
Contributing artist
 The Rough Guide to Highlife (2003, World Music Network)

Awards
VGMA Lifetime Award for Outstanding Contribution to Hilife (2020).

References

1951 births
Living people
Palm wine musicians
Ghanaian highlife musicians